Carl Friedrich Wilhelm Grabow (15 April 1802 – 15 April 1874) was a Prussian civil servant, judge, and politician.

Biography

In 1848, he was the main author of the election law for the Prussian National Assembly, of which he was the president from 27 June to 26 October. He resigned the presidency, and his mandate, voluntarily. In the parliament, he belonged to the constitutional right, and played a significant role. Grabow was the only representative who took part in the congress of constitutional associations on 22 July 1848.

The Potsdam election district No. 8 elected him in 1849 to the Prussian House of Representatives and he became its president in the first legislative period from February to April. He joined the right centre. Due to his oppositional stance over the imposition of the constitution of 5 December 1848, and especially the question of the three class franchise, his election to lord mayor of Magdeburg in 1850 was not confirmed. After long hesitation, his election to mayor of Prenzlau was permitted, but limited to 12 years, rather than for life. 

Out of protest against the abolition of universal suffrage, against the new electoral law and the re-establishment of the local and provincial assemblies, Grabow withdrew from political life for a while. He only rejoined the House of Representatives from 1858, serving as its vice-president in 1860-1861 and, from January 1862 to February 1866, as its president again. He led a right-liberal faction, named after him. 

In 1866, he declined to be re-elected president, in order to allow a reconciliation with the government. In the previous years, he had repeatedly protested against the weak budgetary powers of the second house, which had put him at odds with Otto von Bismarck's ministers.

Footnotes

Further reading

Klaus Herdepe: Die preußische Verfassungsfrage 1848. Neuried 2002, p. 174f.
Bernd Haunfelder: Biographisches HB für das preuß. Abgeordnetenhaus 1849–1867. Droste-Verlag, Düsseldorf 1993, .
Jürgen Theil: Prenzlauer Stadtlexikon und Geschichte in Daten. Prenzlau 2005, p. 66f.
Klaus Grabow: "Carl Friedrich Grabow". In: Mitteilungen des Uckermärkischen Geschichtsvereins zu Prenzlau. Heft 2, 1993, p. 50–58.
Olaf Gründel: "Grabow". In: Friedrich Beck, Eckart Henning (eds.): Brandenburgisches Biografisches Lexikon. Potsdam 2002, p. 149.
Werner Pöls: "Grabow, Wilhelm". In: Neue Deutsche Biographie (NDB). Band 6, Duncker & Humblot, Berlin 1964, p. 701
Karl Wippermann: "Grabow, Wilhelm". In: Allgemeine Deutsche Biographie (ADB). Band 9, Duncker & Humblot, Leipzig 1879, p. 542–547.
Helge Dvorak: Biographisches Lexikon der Deutschen Burschenschaft. Band I Politiker, Teilband 2: F–H. Heidelberg 1999, p. 164–165.

Members of the Prussian House of Representatives
Members of the Provincial Parliament of Brandenburg
Member of the Prussian National Assembly

1802 births
1874 deaths